Clusia paralicola is a species of flowering plant in the family Clusiaceae. It is found in northeastern Brazil (Paraíba, Pernambuco, Bahia, Alagoas).

It was described by Geraldo Mariz (born 1923), a Brazilian botanist.

Research about the plant

References 

paralicola
Endemic flora of Brazil
Trees of Brazil